The 1991 CPISRA European Soccer Championship was the european championship for men's national 7-a-side association football teams. CPISRA stands for Cerebral Palsy International Sports & Recreation Association. Athletes with a physical disability competed. The Championship took place in England from 16 to 20 August 1991.

Football 7-a-side was played with modified FIFA rules. Among the modifications were that there were seven players, no offside, a smaller playing field, and permission for one-handed throw-ins. Matches consisted of two thirty-minute halves, with a fifteen-minute half-time break.

Participating teams and officials

Teams

Venues 
The venues to be used for the World Championships were located in Nottingham.

Format 

The first round, or group stage, was a competition between the 4 teams in one group, where engaged in a round-robin tournament within itself. The two highest ranked teams in the group advanced played in the final.

Classification
Athletes with a physical disability competed. The athlete's disability was caused by a non-progressive brain damage that affects motor control, such as cerebral palsy, traumatic brain injury or stroke. Athletes must be ambulant.

Players were classified by level of disability.
 C5: Athletes with difficulties when walking and running, but not in standing or when kicking the ball.
 C6: Athletes with control and co-ordination problems of their upper limbs, especially when running.
 C7: Athletes with hemiplegia.
 C8: Athletes with minimal disability; must meet eligibility criteria and have an impairment that has impact on the sport of football.

Teams must field at least one class C5 or C6 player at all times. No more than two players of class C8 are permitted to play at the same time.

Group stage 
In the first group stage have seen the teams in a one group of four teams.

Finals 
Position 3-4

Final

Statistics

Ranking

See also

References

External links 
 Cerebral Palsy International Sports & Recreation Association (CPISRA)
 International Federation of Cerebral Palsy Football (IFCPF)

1991 in association football
1991
1990–91 in English football
Paralympic association football